Maken is an unincorporated community in Harrison County, West Virginia, United States.

References

Unincorporated communities in Harrison County, West Virginia
Unincorporated communities in West Virginia